Dehestan (also Romanized as Dehestān) is a village in Bozkosh Rural District, in the Central District of Ahar County, East Azerbaijan Province, Iran. At the 2006 census, its population was 138, in 32 families.

References 

Populated places in Ahar County